The 2018–19 Oklahoma State Cowboys basketball team represented Oklahoma State University in the 2018–19 NCAA Division I men's basketball season. They were led by second-head coach Mike Boynton Jr. The Cowboys were members of the Big 12 Conference and played their home games at Gallagher-Iba Arena in Stillwater, Oklahoma.

Previous season 
The Cowboys finished the 2017–18 season with 21–15, 8–10 in Big 12 play to finish in a four-way tie for sixth place. They defeated Oklahoma in the first round of the Big 12 tournament before losing in the quarterfinals to Kansas. They were invited to the National Invitation Tournament where they defeated Florida Gulf Coast and Stanford before losing in the quarterfinals to Western Kentucky.

Departures

Incoming Transfers

Recruits

Future recruits

2019–20 team recruits

Roster

Schedule and results

|-
!colspan=9 style=|Exhibition

|-
!colspan=9 style=|Regular season

|-
!colspan=9 style=| Big 12 tournament

References

Oklahoma State Cowboys basketball seasons
Oklahoma State
Oklahoma State Cowboys bask
Oklahoma State Cowboys bask